The 2020 AFC Champions League knockout stage was played from 26 September to 19 December 2020 in Qatar. A total of 16 teams competed in the knockout stage to decide the champions of the 2020 AFC Champions League.

Qualified teams
The winners and runners-up of each of the eight groups in the group stage advanced to the round of 16, with both West Region (Groups A–D) and East Region (Groups E–H) having eight qualified teams.

Format

In the knockout stage, the 16 teams played a single-elimination tournament, with the teams split into the two regions until the final. Each tie was played as a single-leg match at centralised venues, instead of the usual home-and-away two-legged basis as planned before the COVID-19 pandemic. Extra time and a penalty shoot-out were used to decide the winners if necessary.

Schedule
The schedule of each round was as follows.

The original schedule, as planned before the COVID-19 pandemic, was as follows.
Round of 16: 18–19 May (West Region first legs), 25–27 May (West Region second legs and East Region first legs), 16–17 June (East Region second legs)
Quarter-finals: 24–26 August (first legs), 14–16 September (second legs)
Semi-finals: 29–30 September (first legs), 20–21 October (second legs)
Final: 22 November (first leg), 28 November (second leg)

After meetings with representatives of the member associations from the East Region held on 2 March 2020 and from the West Region held on 7–8 March 2020, it was agreed that the round of 16, quarter-finals and semi-finals would be moved to 10–12 and 24–26 August, 14–16 and 28–30 September, and 20–21 and 27–28 October.

On 9 July 2020, the AFC announced the new schedule for the remaining matches, with all matches before the final played at centralised venues. The West Region round of 16, quarter-finals and semi-finals would be played on 26–27 September, 30 September and 3 October, and the East Region round of 16, quarter-finals and semi-finals would be played on 3–4 November, 25 November and 28 November. The final would be played on 5 December, at a venue in the West Region. On 10 September 2020, the AFC announced that East Region round of 16, quarter-finals and semi-finals were rescheduled to be played on 6–7 December, 10 December and 13 December, and the final were rescheduled to 19 December.

Venues
On 16 July 2020, the AFC announced that Qatar would host all West Region matches after restart. On 27 July 2020, the AFC announced that Malaysia would host two round of 16 matches involving teams from Group G and H, and both quarter-finals and the semi-final of the East Region. However, on 9 October 2020, the AFC announced that following an agreement with Qatar Football Association, all East Region matches after restart would also be played in Qatar. On 16 October 2020, the AFC announced that the final would be played in Qatar.

The following centralised venues in Qatar were used:
Al Janoub Stadium, Al Wakrah (2 round of 16 matches of West Region, 2 quarter-finals and 1 semi-final of East Region, and final)
Education City Stadium, Al Rayyan (2 round of 16 matches of West Region, 2 round of 16 matches of East Region)
Jassim bin Hamad Stadium, Doha (2 quarter-finals and 1 semi-final of West Region)
Khalifa International Stadium, Doha (2 round of 16 matches of East Region)

Bracket
The bracket of the knockout stage was determined as follows:

The bracket was decided after the draw for the quarter-finals. The draw for the West Region quarter-finals was held on 28 September 2020, 11:00 AST (UTC+3), and the draw for the East Region quarter-finals was held on 8 December 2020, 11:30 AST (UTC+3), both in Doha, Qatar.

Round of 16

Summary

In the round of 16, the winners of one group played against the runners-up of another group from the same region and the matchups were determined by the group stage draw.

|+West Region

|}

|+East Region

|}

West Region

East Region

Quarter-finals

Summary

In the quarter-finals, the four teams from the West Region played in two ties, and the four teams from the East Region played in two ties, with the matchups decided by draw, without any seeding or country protection. The draw for the West Region quarter-finals was held on 28 September 2020, and the draw for the East Region quarter-finals was held on 8 December 2020.

|+West Region

|}

|+East Region

|}

West Region

East Region

Semi-finals

Summary

In the semi-finals, the two quarter-final winners from the West Region played against each other, and the two quarter-final winners from the East Region played against each other.

|+West Region

|}

|+East Region

|}

West Region

East Region

Final

In the final, the two semi-final winners played against each other, at Al Janoub Stadium in Al Wakrah, Qatar.

Notes

References

External links
, the-AFC.com
AFC Champions League 2020, stats.the-AFC.com

3
September 2020 sports events in Asia
October 2020 sports events in Asia
November 2020 sports events in Asia
December 2020 sports events in Asia